Attainders of Earl of Westmorland and others Act 1571 was an Act of Parliament of the Parliament of England (13 Eliz.1 c.16) which confirmed the attainder against Charles Neville, 6th Earl of Westmorland and 57 others for their part in the Rising of the North, a plot against Queen Elizabeth I.

It was repealed by section 1(1) of, and Part 4 of Schedule 1 to, the Statute Law (Repeals) Act 1977 (c.18).

References
Chronological Table of the Statutes: 1235-2007, UK Stationery Office (2009) p. 55

1571 in law
1571 in England
Acts of the Parliament of England (1485–1603)